Haminoea antillarum, the Antilles paper bubble or Antilles glassy bubble, is a species of sea snail in the family Haminoeidae.

Distribution
This species occurs in the Caribbean Sea off East Florida, in the United States to Colombia. It has been found off Cuba and the Virgin Islands and in the Atlantic Ocean off Eastern Brazil.

Description
The length of the shell varies between 7 mm and 20 mm.

References

 Thompson, T. E. (1977). Jamaican opisthobranch molluscs I. Journal of Molluscan Studies. 43: 93-140

External links
 Rosenberg, G.; Moretzsohn, F.; García, E. F. (2009). Gastropoda (Mollusca) of the Gulf of Mexico, Pp. 579–699 in: Felder, D.L. and D.K. Camp (eds.), Gulf of Mexico–Origins, Waters, and Biota. Texas A&M Press, College Station, Texas
 Gastropods.com: Haminoea antillarum antillarum

antillarum
Gastropods described in 1841